The Chenggong Fish Harbor is a port in Chenggong Township, Taitung County, Taiwan.

Facilities
The port features a fish market and boat rides for tourists for whales and dolphins viewing annually in May-October.

Transportation
The port is accessible by bus from Taitung Station of Taiwan Railways Administration.

See also
 Transportation in Taiwan

References

Ports and harbors of Taitung County